Noorjahan is an Indian series produced by Cinevistaas, and co written and directed by Mr. Imtiaz Khan. It was  based on the life of Mughal Queen Noorjahan which aired on Doordarshan in 2000-2001. It was bilingual, shot in English and Hindi.

The title role in the show was played by Gauri Pradhan, while model-turned-actor Milind Soman played Prince Salim with Kruttika Giresh Desai opposite him as his wife Maanbai.

Ghazal artist Talat Aziz and singer Jaspinder Narula sung many ghazals and Love Duets in the show

Cast 
 Mangal Dhillon as Emperor Akbar
 Smita Jaykar as Maharani Jodha Bai
 Milind Soman as Prince Salim / Emperor Jahangir
 Gauri Pradhan as Mehrunissa/ Queen Noor Jahan
 Krutika Desai Khan as Maharani Maan Bai
 Puneet Issar as Sher Afgan Khan
 Salil Ankola as Kashmiri poet Yusuf Chak
 Mrinal Kulkarni as Habba Khatoon
 Maya Alagh
 Parikshit Sahni as Mirza Ghiyas Beg
 Ruhshad Nariman Daruwalla as Mehrunissa's elder brother
 Gajendra Chauhan
 Mahendra Sandhu
 Ranjeeta Kaur
 Rahul Bhat

References

External links 
 Noorjahan on IMDb

2000 Indian television series debuts
DD National original programming
2001 Indian television series endings
Indian historical television series
Indian period television series
Mughal Empire in fiction
Cultural depictions of Akbar
Television series set in the 16th century
Television series set in the 17th century
Cultural depictions of Jahangir